Alyas Pogi 2 is a 1992 Filipino action film directed by Toto Natividad. Ramon "Bong" Revilla Jr. reprises his role as the titular policeman. It is the sequel to the 1990 film Alyas Pogi: Birador ng Nueva Ecija. Produced by Moviestars Production, the film was released on August 26, 1992.

Critic Justino Dormiendo of the Manila Standard gave the film a severely negative review for its dialogue and sadistic violence, describing it as a "theater of cruelty." A sequel, Alyas Pogi: Ang Pagbabalik, was released in 1999.

The film is streaming online on YouTube.

Cast
Ramon "Bong" Revilla Jr. as Pogi / Pat. Henry Cruz
Rita Avila as Divina
Charito Solis as Sianang
Jay Ilagan as Jimboy
Michael de Mesa as Banjo
Leo Martinez as Teng-Teng
Lani Lobangco as Lilia
Bernard Bonnin as Don Pepe
Subas Herrero as Don Felipe
Bomber Moran as Kardong Kalabaw
Rene Hawkins as barrio captain
Zandro Zamora as "hepe"
Philip Gamboa as "hepe"
Ding Salvador as police
Rene Pascual as police
Ruben Rustia as priest
Olive Madredejos as barrio girl
Criz Daluz as "albularyo"
Max Alvarado as shabu distributor
Danny Labra as man in coffin
Bebeng Amora as shabu distributor

Release
Alyas Pogi 2 was released in theaters on August 26, 1992.

Reception
Justino Dormiendo, writing for the Manila Standard, gave the film an extremely negative review, stating that it is "more empty (but noisy) posturing in the local action genre." In addition to his criticisms toward the lack of "intelligent dialogue", he severely criticized the film's "theater of cruelty" and the filmmakers' blatant violation of the instructions from "censors" to remove or shorten seven violent parts of the film by keeping them in, writing that "I left the theater feeling devastated, dehumanized, and degraded by a bunch of sadists on the screen and the perpetrators behind it."

References

External links

Full Movie on Solar Pictures

1992 films
1992 action films
Filipino-language films
Films about police officers
Films shot in Cavite
Films shot in Pampanga
Films shot in Rizal
Moviestars Production films
Philippine action films
Philippine sequel films
Films directed by Toto Natividad